Clark Beckham (born May 15, 1992) is an American singer, songwriter and musician. He finished as the runner-up on the fourteenth season of American Idol.

Early life
Beckham was born in Nashville, Tennessee, but grew up in White House, Tennessee. He is an only child. He graduated from Lee University with a degree in history. Clark got most of his musical experience playing in church and on street corners. In a Christian Post interview Beckham noted that he originally wanted to audition for American Idol at 18 years old, when it came to Nashville, but said that it was not in line with God's will at the time.

Career

American Idol
Beckham auditioned for American Idol singing "It's a Man's, Man's, Man's World" by James Brown. He was the first contestant at the first city, Nashville, Tennessee, to sing in front of the judges. He passed the audition by a split decision: approved by Jennifer Lopez and Keith Urban, disapproved by Harry Connick Jr. During Hollywood week, he sang "Let's Get It On" and "Try a Little Tenderness". In the House of Blues showcase, he sang "Georgia on My Mind", earning his spot in the Top 24.

When asked what one moment stands out for him, Beckham said the time Connick Jr. said, "I don't think you could have done that any better"—after Beckham's performance of Stevie Wonder's "Superstition". "Harry's typically been tough on me," said Beckham. "He's like a coach trying to get the best out of me. And I really appreciate that."

Performances on American Idol

Post-Idol
Beckham has been using his post-Idol expertise in the creation of a YouTube video channel about American Idol. In May 2021, he appeared on the Talent Recap show to discuss the nineteenth season finale. Beckham will also appear in the upcoming film An Old Song.

Discography

Albums
 2013: Clark Beckham (EP)
 2014: Songs About Her (EP)
 2015: Champion
 2015: American Idol Season 14: Best of Clark Beckham
2018: Year One (EP)
2020: Light Year

Accolades

References

External links
 Clark Beckham on American Idol
 

1992 births
American Idol participants
Living people
Musicians from Nashville, Tennessee
People from White House, Tennessee
21st-century American male singers
21st-century American singers